CBER and similar may refer to:
 Center for Biologics Evaluation and Research, one of the six main centers of the Food and Drug Administration
 Center for Business and Economic Research, Ball State University research center
 CBer, a person who uses citizens' band radio
 Coma Berenices, nonstandard abbreviation for the constellation